Hol is a surname. Notable people with the surname include:

Dag Hol (born 1951), Norwegian painter
Diederik Hol (born 1972), Dutch designer
Erik Hol (born 1985), Dutch darts player
Jacoba Hol (1886–1964), physical geographer; daughter of Richard Hol
Jon Hol (1851–1941), Norwegian engineer and activist
Petter Hol (1883–1981), Norwegian gymnast
Richard Hol (1825–1904), Dutch composer and conductor